Come Get Your Wife is the third studio album by American singer-songwriter and musician Elle King, released on January 27, 2023, via RCA Records. Co-produced by King and Ross Copperman, it is King's first album since 2018's Shake the Spirit and was preceded by the singles "Drunk (And I Don't Wanna Go Home)" and "Worth a Shot". King co-wrote eight of the album's thirteen tracks.

Background
King revealed that the title came from a phrase that country singer Chris Young shouted to her partner while they were competing in "wild bar games" while filming the show Barmageddon and quipped “Thanks for the album title, babe” in the Instagram caption, alongside the statement “Each track comes from influences of all genres, and I now know country music is where I belong.” Discussing the project, she explained “This whole album is a crazy quilt of all sorts of moments and things that might not seem to go together, but because they're me, they do. It's very Southern Ohio, very who we are - and very much a lot of people who are just like me, because I know they're out there.”

When discussing the genesis of the album, King explained that, following the success of the single "Drunk (And I Don't Wanna Go Home)", King's team explained that she would have to commit to a full-blown country album if she wanted to maintain the same level of success and radio play in the genre, which initially worried her, as she had just finished recording a pop-leaning album with producer Greg Kurstin which she had to decide not to release in favor of writing and recording Come Get Your Wife. King, who had recently given birth to her son at the time, was told that taking time off would jeopardize her chance to capitalize on her recent success, so she requested that her team utilize the rich songwriting community in Nashville to find some songs for the album that she could pair with songs she had already written herself. She stated that she was initially only pitched songs written specifically for female artists but felt they didn't tend to "fit her vibe", and requested songs that were either written specifically for men or for an artist of any gender. After hearing the song "Out Yonder", King had the writers, Ella Lagnley, Bobby Hamrick and Matt McKinney brought onto her tour bus for two days to write with her, with the quartet ultimately producing four songs for the project. Once she had all of the songs, King and producer Ross Copperman recorded the majority of the album live with the band in two days.

Speaking to People, King explained that she felt she was able to be more vulnerable on this album in comparison to her previous record Shake the Spirit, noting “Now I'm in a place where I have nothing to hide. I'm much more comfortable with being vulnerable. I don't have to be so defensive, I can just be open. This whole album and everything is revealing a lot more about myself, because now I'm much more comfortable because I have nothing… It's not that I don't have anything to prove, because I'll always prove it to you. I will. I love to. But I'm being much more revealing about my life and about a part of my life that I've been so protective of, which is where my family's from and where my family still lives in Ohio, and what truly made me who I am and what brought me here.”

Singles
The album's lead single "Drunk (And I Don't Wanna Go Home)", a duet with country artist Miranda Lambert, was released on February 26, 2021 and subsequently reached number one on the Billboard Country Airplay chart in April 2022. King previously collaborated with Lambert on a 2019 cover of "Fooled Around and Fell in Love" alongside Maren Morris, Tenille Townes, Ashley McBryde and Caylee Hammack to promote her Roadside Bars & Pink Guitars Tour.

The second official single from Come Get Your Wife, "Worth a Shot", a duet with country artist Dierks Bentley, was released on June 6, 2022. They previously collaborated on "Different for Girls", a track from Bentley's 2016 album, Black.

Three songs were also released as promotional singles ahead of the album — "Out Yonder", "Try Jesus", and "Tulsa". When describing "Tulsa", which features backing vocals from Ashley McBryde, King explained: 'Tulsa is a song about doing someone wrong. This is not about tearing women down but it’s about putting the blame on the wrongdoer. If a man is cheating on you, it’s not her fault because there are a million other girls he would do it with. And he’ll just cheat on her too. It’s a song about uniting and not taking shit from this real P.O.S.' "Try Jesus" also received a music video directed by American actress Edi Patterson.

King released a cover of Tyler Childers' "Jersey Giant" as a standalone single on November 11, 2022, but it was included on the digital versions of Come Get Your Wife. Childers explained that he wrote the song but that he stopped performing it after a short time and decided to give the song to King. Of the song, King stated “Tyler Childers is not too far from where my family lives and he’s a legend. The life of a song is something so beautiful to me, and country music has taught me to see that the opportunity to sing a song written by someone else, is nothing short of a gift, a blessing. I was humbled and so excited that Tyler gave his song to me. I tried to blend the two worlds of honoring traditional bluegrass and what country music is to me.”

Track listing

Note
 "Jersey Giant" is excluded from physical releases.

Personnel
Credits adapted from AllMusic.

Vocals

 
 Dierks Bentley – duet vocals 
 Abby Cahours – background vocals 
 Naomi Cahours – background vocals 
 Nickie Conely – choir 
 Jason Eskridge – choir 
 Martin Johnson – background vocals
 Miranda Lambert – duet vocals, background vocals 
 Elle King – lead vocals, background vocals 

 Ashley McBryde – background vocals 
 Wil Merrell – choir 
 Brandon Paddock – background vocals
 Kiley Phillips – choir 
 Katie Wilshire – background vocals 
 Micah Wilshire – background vocals 
 Charlie Worsham – background vocals 

Musicians

 
 Tyler Chiarelli – Dobro, electric guitar 
 Dave Cohen – keyboards, synthesizer, accordion 
 Ross Copperman – programming, acoustic guitar, keyboards 
 Fred Eltringham – drums, percussion 
 Jenee Fleenor – fiddle, mandolin 
 Jesse Frasure – programming 
 Dan Dugmore – pedal steel guitar, electric guitar, Dobro 
 Kenny Greenberg – electric guitar 
 Sean Hurley – bass guitar 
 Rob Humphreys – drums 
 Martin Johnson – acoustic guitar, electric guitar, synthesizer 
 David Kalmusky – electric guitar 
 Elle King – acoustic guitar 
 Todd Lombardo – acoustic guitar, banjo, mandolin 

 Tony Lucido – bass guitar 
 Rob McNelley – electric guitar, acoustic guitar 
 Kyle Moorman – programming 
 John Osborne – electric guitar 
 Brandon Paddock – percussion, programming, synthesizer 
 Lex Price – bass guitar, mandolin 
 Danny Rader – acoustic guitar, electric guitar 
 Ketch Secor – fiddle 
 F. Reid Shippen – programming 
 Ilya Toshinskiy – acoustic guitar 
 Charlie Worsham – acoustic guitar, accordion, banjo, mandolin 
 Jonathan Yudkin – cello, viola, violin 
 Nir Z – drums, percussion 

Technical

 Daniel Bacigalupi – mastering 
 Ethan Barrette – engineering assistance 
 Matthew Berniato – package design, photography 
 Jeff Braun – mixing 
 Ross Copperman – engineering, producer
 Perry Geyer – engineering 
 Mark Hagen – editing
 Brandon Hood – editing 
 Ted Jensen – mastering 
 Martin Johnson – producer 
 Scott Johnson – production manger 

 Elle King — producer 
 Buckley Miller – engineering 
 Kyle Moorman – engineering
 Brandon Paddock – engineering, producer
 Justin Sheriff – engineering 
 F. Reid Shippen – mixing, engineering 
 Brandon Towles – engineering assistance
 Rob Whitaker – engineering 
 Brian David Willis – editing 
 Charlie Worsham – engineering

Charts

References

2023 albums
Elle King albums
RCA Records albums